Maung Khaing (also spelled Maung Khine) was the first Magistrate of Yangon (Rangoon) in the early British colonial period of Myanmar (Burma). Khaing's father was Gov. Myat Phyu of Shwegyin, who had defected to the British in 1832, and became Magistrate of North Moulmein (Mawlamyaing). After the Second Anglo-Burmese War, his father-in-law Htaw Lay and Khaing used their influence with the colonial government to stop the occupation forces' pillaging of Buddhist shrines around Yangon, and restored the war damaged Shwedagon Pagoda. 

Both Khaing and Htaw Lay were awarded the title of KSM (Kyet-tha-yay-saung Shwe-salwe-ya Min), the highest honor for public service bestowed by the colonial government. The colonial government named two wide streets in downtown Yangon after Khaing and Htaw Lay. The two street names survived the renaming of Yangon streets until 1989. The bus stop "Maung Khaing" is named after Khaing.

Notes

References

Bibliography
 
 
 
 
 

People from British Burma
Burmese people of Mon descent
Year of birth uncertain
Year of birth unknown